North Tanna is a language spoken on the northern coast of Tanna Island in Vanuatu. It is similar to Whitesands, but its exact position within the Tanna languages is not established.

References

 

Languages of Vanuatu
South Vanuatu languages